In legend and in the early historiography of Switzerland there is an account of a migration of a population of Swedes and Frisians settling in the Swiss Alps, specifically in Schwyz and in Hasli (Schwedensage).

Medieval legend
The legend is discussed in Ericus Olai's Chronica regni Gothorum (c. 1470).  Olai notes that the Swiss (Svitenses) claimed to be descended from "Swedes or Goths". Olai also notes the similarity in toponymy, Swycia, quasi Suecia. This is reflected in a late-15th-century gloss from Reichenau reading Suecia, alias Helvicia, inde Helvici, id est Suetones.

A near-contemporary record is that of Petermann Etterlin, who wrote in the 1470s (printed as Chronicle of the Swiss Confederation in 1507).
Etterlin telling the legend refers to "the Swedes, who are now called the Switzer" presents an eponymous founder, one Suit (Swit, Schwyt, Switer), leader of the migrating Swedes, who defeated his brother Scheyg in single combat in a dispute over leadership of the new settlement. He gives an account of their decision to settle on the site of Schwyz:

Etterlin's account is supposedly based on a "common Swiss chronicle" (Gesta Suitensium, gemeine Schwyzerchronik) also reflected in the White Book of Sarnen, Heinrich von Gundelfingen (Das Herkommen der Schwyzer und Oberhasler) and later by Aegidius Tschudi. 
Etterlin presents the three Waldstätten as representing three different stocks or races, the people of Schwyz as the most recent immigrants (from Sweden), the people of Uri representing the original "Goths and Huns", and the people of Unterwalden representing "the Romans".

Henrich von Gundelfingen gives an elaborate version of the legend, stating the emigration from Sweden and Frisia was due to a famine, which was met by king "Cisbertus of Sweden" by a decree that every month, the lot should be drawn and one in ten men would be forced to emigrate with all his family and possessions. Heinrich is the origin of the figures of 6,000 Swedes and 1,200 Frisians taking part in the migration with a certain Suicerus as their leader.

The legend is also mentioned by Albrecht von Bonstetten, a monk in Einsiedeln abbey, in 1479 (Superius Germanie Confederationis descriptio). In this version, the toponym Schwyz derives from a Swedish founder named Switerus.

Sigismund Meisterlin (d. 1488) in his Chronicon Norimbergense claims the people of Schwyz as descendants of the Huns, with a leader called Swifter ruling the valley, while his brother Senner ruled the high pastures.

Records from the early 16th century confirm that the tradition was in fact part of local folklore (and not the result of learned etymological speculation); in an Urner Tellenspiel performed between 1511 and 1525, the identification of Gothic and Hunnic ancestry of Uri, Roman ancestry of Unterwalden and Swedish ancestry
of Schwyz,
and for the Landsgemeinde of Schwyz in 1531 we have the record of a performance of an Andacht der Altvorderen (remembrance of the forefathers) in memory of the Austreibung aus Schweden (eviction from Sweden) in times of famine.

The saga is also reflected in early-16th-century Frisian chronicles such as the Tractatus Alvinus, Jancko Douwama's Boeck der Partijen and subsequent writings, as well as in the biography of the condottiere Wilwolt von Schaumberg from Thuringia, who led the conquest of Frisia by Albert of Saxony in 1498. According to the latter, 'the Frisians, when they write to each other, even nowadays, call the Swiss "son" and the Swiss call the Frisians "cousin".'

The first critical evaluation of the story is that of Tschudi in 1570, who is unsure if he should reject the account of Kiburger wholesale, or if the tradition might have a historical source in the Cimbri of 114 BC (unlike his 19th-century successors, Tschudi does not consider the possibility of a Viking Age migration).

Early Modern reception
Once the legend had been written down in the late 15th century Swiss chronicles it became a standard topos of the early modern historiography of Switzerland. 
The legend did remain current in the folklore of Schwyz and Hasli in the 19th century, no doubt reinforced by historiographical and literary tradition. 
Schiller's William Tell (1804) makes reference to the legend (act 2, scene 2), in the voice of Stauffacher. The Brothers Grimm included the legend in their Deutsche Sagen of 1818 (nr. 514 Auswanderung der Schweizer), and Ludwig Bechstein in his Deutsches Sagenbuch (1853) includes it as nr. 2  Des Schweizervolkes Ursprung ). 
In Sweden, Uppsala historian Jakob Ek published an account of the legend in De Colonia Suecorum in Helvetiam egressa (1797).

Johannes von Müller in 1780 accepted that the foundational population of Schwyz was a separate race (i.e. separate from that of Uri and Unterwalden) and argued that this was still visible in the "exceptionally handsome" population of Oberhasli and the neighbouring Bernese Oberland as well as of Entlebuch.
Johann Georg Kohl (1849) also described the physiology of the people of Oberhasli as being of the Scandinavian type, as "remarkably tall, strong and blond".

Erik Gustaf Geijer in his History of the Swedes (1832–36) notes that the legend was now limited to the population of Haslidale but had once also been generally believed by the people of Schwyz. In this version, the Swedes march from a place called Hasle on the banks of the Rhine, defeating a Frankish army on the way, and settle in the alpine valleys because the landscape reminded them of their own country.
Geijer adds his opinion that the events would fall into the "age of the northern expeditions" (i.e. the Viking Age) of the 9th century. He cites a Viking Age chronicle which relates that in 861 a Viking expedition ascended the Mosel and wintered in a fortified camp at a place called Haslow, defeated a Frankish army and moved onward pillaging along the Rhine.
Geijer equates this expedition with one mentioned in Óláfs saga Tryggvasonar, in which the sons of Ragnar Lodbrok participated, advancing as far as Wiflisburg (Avenches) in Switzerland.

In 1846, Johann Georg Kohl travelled to Hasli, describing both its natural landscape and its population. Kohl recorded a tradition telling of a march of 6,000 Frisians and Swedes exiled from their homes by a famine. The names of the leaders of the immigrating Swedes is reported as Restius and Hastus. Kohl describes the architecture of the Meiringen church as reminiscent of North Frisian and Scandinavian types.
The Hasli legend was received in Scandinavian Romantic nationalism, with e.g. Danish poet Adam Oehlenschläger publishing a poem Haslidalen in 1849.

Further reading
 ‘Der Mythos von der Abstammung der Schwyzer und der Haslitaler von den frommen Schweden’, in: Historisches Lexikon der Schweiz (2012)
 Heinrich von Gundelfingen, Das Herkommen der Schwyzer und Oberhasler, in: Repertorium "Geschichtsquellen des deutschen Mittelalters" (2012)
 Guy P. Marchal, Die frommen Schweden in Schwyz: Das 'Herkommen der Schwyzer und Oberhasler' als Quelle zum schwyzerischen Selbstverständnis im 15. und 16. Jahrhundert (Basler Beiträge zur zur Geschichtswissenschaft, Vol. 138), Basel/Stuttgart 1976
 Leo Zehnder, Volkskundliches in der älteren schweizerischen Chronistik (Schriften der Schweizerischen Gesellschaft für Volkskunde, vol. 60), Basel 1976, pp. 613-623
 Willy Krogmann, ‘Ostfriesland in der Schweizer Sage’, in: Rheinisches Jahrbuch für Volkskunde 13/14 (1962/63), pp. 81-112
 M.P. van Buijtenen, 'Friezen en Zwitsers', in: Tijdschrift voor Geschiedenis 76 (1963), pp. 319-324 (German abstract)
 Maja Norberg, Bruket av Haslisägnen i svensk och schweizisk historieskrivning under 1800-talet. The use of the Hasli legendin Swedish and Swiss history during the 19th century, Karlstad 2014
 Werner Meyer, ‘Die Alpen als Migrationsraum im Mittelalter. Abschiedsvorlesung am 5. Februar 2003’, in: Mittelalter: Zeitschrift des Schweizerischen Burgenvereins 8 (2003), pp. 17-23
 Gerhard Winterberger, 'Die Herkunft der Oberhasler', in: Berner Zeitschrift für Geschichte und Heimatkunde 17 (1955), pp. 19-27
 Ferdinand Vetter, Ueber die Sage von der Herkunft der Schwyzer und Oberhasler aus Schweden und Friesland, Bern 1877
 Jakob Bächtold, Die Stretlinger Chronik. Ein Beitrag zur Sagen- und Legendengeschichte der Schweiz aus dem XV. Jahrhundert. Mit einem Anhang: Vom Herkommen der Schwyzer und Oberhasler, Frauenfeld 1877
 Hugo Hungerbühler, Vom Herkommen der Schwyzer : eine wiederaufgefundene Schrift aus dem XV Jahrhundert mit Erläuterungen und kritischen Untersuchungen, St. Gallen 1871

See also
Historiography of Switzerland
Name of Switzerland
Name of Sweden
Gutasaga
Walser migrations

References

Historiography of Switzerland
Medieval Switzerland
Medieval legends
Origin hypotheses of ethnic groups